The Silver Slugger Award is awarded annually to the best offensive player at each position in both the American League (AL) and the National League (NL), as determined by the coaches and managers of Major League Baseball (MLB). These voters consider several offensive categories in selecting the winners, including batting average, slugging percentage, and on-base percentage, in addition to "coaches' and managers' general impressions of a player's overall offensive value". Managers and coaches are not permitted to vote for players on their own team. The Silver Slugger was first awarded in 1980 and is given by Hillerich & Bradsby, the manufacturer of Louisville Slugger bats. The award is a bat-shaped trophy, 3 feet (91 cm) tall, engraved with the names of each of the winners from the league and plated with sterling silver.

Only National League pitchers receive a Silver Slugger Award; lineups in the American League include the designated hitter, who replaces the pitcher in the batting order, so the designated hitter receives the award instead. However, in the  season, the universal DH was used, and as a result, no National League pitcher was awarded the Silver Slugger Award. Mike Hampton has won the most Silver Sluggers as a pitcher, earning five consecutive awards with four different teams from 1999 to 2003. Tom Glavine is a four-time winner (1991, 1995–1996, 1998) with the Atlanta Braves. Rick Rhoden (1984–1986), Don Robinson (1982, 1989–1990), and Carlos Zambrano (2006, 2008–2009) each own three Silver Sluggers. Two-time winners include the inaugural winner, Bob Forsch (1980, 1987), Fernando Valenzuela (1981, 1983), who won the Cy Young Award, the Rookie of the Year Award, and the Silver Slugger in his first full major league season, and Madison Bumgarner (2014–2015).

Hampton has hit the most home runs in a pitcher's Silver Slugger-winning season, with seven in 2001. He is tied with Robinson as the leader in runs batted in, with 16 (Hampton, 2001; Robinson, 1982). Zack Greinke leads all Silver Slugger-winning pitchers in on-base percentage with a .409 clip set in 2013. Orel Hershiser leads winning pitchers in batting average, with the .356 mark he set in 1993. Micah Owings is the slugging percentage leader among winners (.683 in 2007).

With the universal designated hitter introduced in 2022 in both the National League and the American League, Max Fried, who won in 2021, is the final winner of the Silver Slugger award for pitchers.

Key

Winners

References

Inline citations

External links
Louisville Slugger - The Silver Slugger Award

Silver Slugger Award
+
Awards established in 1980